Ferre may refer to:

People

Given name
 Ferré Gola (born 1976), Congolese singer 
 Ferre Grignard (1939-1982), Belgian skiffle-singer
 Ferre Spruyt (born 1986), Belgian speed skater

Surname
 Adelaida Ferré Gomis (1881-1955), Catalan lace-maker
 Maurice Ferré (1935-2019), American politician
 Michelle Ferre (born 1973), French-Japanese actress and journalist
 Todd Rivaldo Ferre (born 1999), Indonesian footballer
 Vicente Ferre (died 1682), Spanish theologian

Other uses 
 Fer, the French wine grape that is also known as Ferre